Alena Stellnerová (born 22 August 1989) is a Czech handballer for Sokol Písek and the Czech national team.

She participated at the 2018 European Women's Handball Championship.

References

1989 births
Living people
Sportspeople from Písek
Czech female handball players